John H. Young Jr. (12 January 1917 – June 2006) was a Bermudian swimmer. He competed in two events at the 1936 Summer Olympics.

References

1917 births
2006 deaths
Bermudian male swimmers
Olympic swimmers of Bermuda
Swimmers at the 1936 Summer Olympics
People from Sandys Parish